Elbie is a given name. Notable people with the name include:

 Elbie Fletcher (1916–1994), American baseball player
 Elbie Lebrecht, specialist librarian, publishing editor and sculptor
 Elbie Nickel (1922–2007), American football player
 Elbie Schultz (1917–2002), American football player